Forest Blakk is a Canadian pop singer and songwriter.

Career
In 2015 he released "Love Me", his first single. The song reached #34 on the Canadian hot adult contemporary charts in Billboard. His second single, "Where I First Found You", followed in 2017, and the EP Minutes was released in 2018.

His second EP, Sideways, followed in 2020. In 2021, a remix of his single "If You Love Her" as a duet with Meghan Trainor peaked #61 on the Canadian Hot 100, and scored him his first Billboard chart placements in the United States on the Emerging Artists and Adult Top 40 Airplay charts.

He was a nominee for the Juno Fan Choice Award at the Juno Awards of 2022.

Discography

Studio albums
Every Little Detail (2022)

EP
Minutes (2018)
Sideways (2020)

Singles
"Love Me" (2017)
"Where I First Found You" (2017)
"Swipe Right" (2018)
"Find Me" (2018)
"Breathe" (2018)
"Put Your Hands Up" (2019)
"Wildfire" (2020)
"Foolish" (2020)
"Both Sides" (feat. Kamilah Marshall) (2020)
"If You Love Her" (2020)
"If You Love Her" (feat. Meghan Trainor) (2021)
"The Most Beautiful Thought" (2021)
"Sing Along With Me" (2021)
"Fall Into Me" (2021)
"Give You Love" (2022)

References

External links

21st-century Canadian male singers
Canadian pop singers
Canadian male singers
Musicians from Montreal
Musicians from Calgary
Living people
Year of birth missing (living people)